Lynn H. Cohick is an American New Testament scholar and author. Since January 2021 she has been Provost, Academic Dean and Professor of New Testament at Northern Seminary.

Education
Cohick holds a BA from Messiah College in Religious Studies. She completed the PhD program at the University of Pennsylvania where she looked at the relationship between Jews and Christians in the ancient world, in particular the second century figure Melito of Sardis and his work Peri Pascha. Her subsequent book, The Peri Pascha Attributed to Melito of Sardis: Setting, Purpose, and Sources, is one of the only major studies on this work.

Career
Cohick taught pastors and church leaders at the Nairobi Evangelical Graduate School of Theology in Kenya. Her international teaching also includes courses at Brisbane School of Theology and Ridley College in Australia and Regent College in Canada.

Cohick taught New Testament at Wheaton College from 2000-2018, sequentially serving as Vice-Chair of the Faulty, chairing the Bible and Theology Department, and as interim dean of Humanities and Theological Studies, in her three last years at Wheaton College.

Cohick was Provost, Dean and Professor of New Testament at Denver Seminary from 2018 to 2020. On January 19, 2021, she commenced at Northern Seminary in Chicago as Provost, Dean of Academic Affairs and Professor of New Testament after a national search attracting 15 diverse applicants. Cohick was involved in launching a new Master's degree program in Women's Studies at Northern Seminary in April 2021.

Cohick is a member of the Evangelical Theological Society, the Institute for Biblical Research, the North American Patristics Society and the Studiorum Novi Testamenti Societas. She became President of the Institute for Biblical Research in 2019. She has also been involved with the Langham Partnership. In 2020, Cohick joined the Board of Trustees of Biola University, located in La Mirada, CA.

Cohick's research has focused on the Christian faith in its ancient Hellenistic setting within the Roman Empire. She believes the apostle Paul's teaching on women has been taken out of context. She believes there has been an "evangelical shortsightedness" and lack of "historical memory" that does not acknowledge the significant roles of women in the church throughout the whole of church history. She has written a number of books and commentaries on Pauline epistles.

From 2017 to 2018, Cohick co-hosted a weekly podcast called Theology for Life with Ed Stetzer. Since 2021, Cohick co-hosts a weekly podcast, The Alabaster Jar, with Northern Seminary colleagues Ingrid Faro and Beth Felker Jones on current issues impacting women in theology and ministry.

Personal life
Cohick is married; her husband is a musician.

Selected publications

References

External links
 Cohick on Women in the Roman world
Northern Seminary

Living people
Year of birth missing (living people)
Messiah University alumni
University of Pennsylvania alumni
Wheaton College (Illinois) faculty
New Testament scholars
American biblical scholars
American academic administrators
Women academic administrators
Female biblical scholars